The women's 63 kg judo competition at the 2012 Summer Paralympics was held on 31 August at the ExCeL London convention center in London, United Kingdom.

Results

Repechage

References

External links
 

W63
Judo at the Summer Paralympics Women's Half Middleweight
Paralympics W63